Dar os Salam (also Romanized as Dār os Salām) is a village in Fazl Rural District, in the Central District of Nishapur County, Razavi Khorasan Province, Iran. At the 2006 census, its population was 110, in 41 families.

References 

Populated places in Nishapur County